Guoli may refer to these towns in China:

Guoli, Zoucheng (郭里), in Zoucheng, Shandong
Guoli, Huantai County (果里), in Huantai County, Shandong

See also
Guo Li (born 1993), Chinese synchronised swimmer